The 1998 FIFA World Player of the Year award was won by Zinedine Zidane. The ceremony was held at the Teatro Nacional de Catalunya, in Barcelona on February 1, 1999. 132 national team coaches, based on the current FIFA Men's World Ranking were chosen to vote. It was organised by European Sports Media, Adidas, FIFA and the Spanish newspaper Don Balon.

Results

References

See also

FIFA World Player of the Year
FIFA World Player of the Year